Ronald Davis (28 December 1914 – 24 October 1989) was a British and Welsh international field hockey player.  In the 1948 Summer Olympics, he was a member of the British field hockey team which won the silver medal. He played one match as a forward.

References

External links
 
profile

1914 births
1989 deaths
British male field hockey players
Olympic field hockey players of Great Britain
Field hockey players at the 1948 Summer Olympics
Olympic silver medallists for Great Britain
Olympic medalists in field hockey
Medalists at the 1948 Summer Olympics